St. Patrick's Society for the Foreign Missions (Latin Societas Sancti Patritii pro Missionibus ad Exteros; also known as the Kiltegan Fathers) is a Catholic society of apostolic life of pontifical right for men composed of missionary priests. Its headquarters is at Kiltegan, County Wicklow in Ireland. Its members add the nominal initials SPS after their names to indicate their membership in the Society. The motto in Latin and English of the Society is Caritas Christi Urget Nos and Christ's love compels us, (2 Corinthians 5:14), respectively.

History
The Kiltegan Fathers origins stem from an appeal by Bishop Joseph (Ignatius) Shanahan of the Holy Ghost Order, in 1920 to the seminary students in Maynooth College for missionaries to Nigeria, Africa, where he was bishop; later that year Fr. Whitney accompanied Bishop Shanahan to Africa.

The society was founded officially on St Patrick's Day, 17 March 1932 by Monsignor Patrick Whitney (1894 - 1942) at Kiltegan, County Wicklow, Ireland. Its original aim was the Christian evangelization of Nigeria. In 1951, the society expanded its missionary activities outside of Nigeria.

In the 1950s the society expanded, building a new college in Kiltegan, and opening a House of Studies in Sutton House, Rochestown, Douglas in Cork, with seminarians attending lectures in University College Cork.

In 1997 the Kiltegan Fathers, with the drop in vocations from Ireland, officially decided to open up internationally and set up houses of formation in Nigeria and Kenya. In 2000 trainee priests began studying philosophy in St Joseph’s Institute in Cedara, South Africa, and KWA Patrick house was setup. 2002 seen students study theology at the Kiltegan House in Nairobi, as the Society joined other orders in Tangaza University College. Also in 2002 a house of formation was founded in Lusaka, Zambia.

As of 2018, the society has 253 priests on four continents including the countries of Nigeria, Cameroon, Kenya, Malawi, South Sudan, Zambia, Zimbabwe, South Africa, Uganda, Grenada, Brazil, the United States, Italy, England, Scotland, Wales and Ireland.

St. Patricks - High Park, Kiltegan
The Society moved to High Park, about 2 km from Kiltegan Co. Wicklow the former home of the Westby family, and named it St. Patrick's. It had been donated by a catholic businessman John Hughes to Fr. Pat Whitney in 1929. Fr. Whitney took over the building in 1930. The High Park residence had been rebuilt after it had been damaged in the 1798 rebellion.

Timeline
 1920 - Appeal by Bishop Joseph (Ignatius) Shanahan 
 1929 - Donation of High Park, Kiltegan to Fr Whitney
 1932 - Formal Foundation
 1934 - Kiltegans take charge of Calabar when the Diocese was divided
 1951 - First Mission outside Nigeria was to Kenya
 1956 - Kiltegan Fathers took over Kitui, Kenya from the Holy Ghost Fathers
 1961 - First mission to Brazil
 1967 - Outbreak of the Nigerian Civil War
 1970 - Kiltegan Fathers went to West Indies
 1970 - Kiltegan Fathers went to Malawi
 1983 - Mission in South Sudan
 1989 - Seen Missions to Cameroon, South African and Zimbabwe
 1993 - Society first sought members from outside Ireland
 1997 - Society opened houses of formation in East, West and Central Africa 
 2015 - Headquarters moved to Nairobi, Kenya

Abuse cases
In May 2011 allegations of sexual abuse by a member of the society in Africa were made on the RTÉ programme Prime Time Investigates.

Jeremiah McGrath, SPS was convicted in Liverpool, England in May 2007 for facilitating abuse by a paedophile named Billy Adams. McGrath had given Adams £20,000 in 2005 and Adams had used the money to impress 12-year-old jade critchlow whom he then raped over a six-month period. McGrath denied knowing about the abuse but admitted having a brief sexual relationship with Adams. His appeal in January 2008 was dismissed.

In 2003 the society paid €325,000 for abuse committed by Fr. Peter Kennedy, SPS in 1982.

Notable members of the Society
 Bishop Derek Byrne, SPS - Bishop of Primavera do Leste–Paranatinga, Brazil (2014- ), Bishop of Guiratinga, Brazil (2008-2014)
 Bishop Edmund Fitzgibbon, SPS - Bishop of the Roman Catholic Diocese of Warri in Nigeria.
 Bishop John Magee, SPS - Bishop of Roman Catholic Diocese of Cloyne, Ireland (1987-2010), Master of Papal Ceremonies, The Vatican (1982-1987), Papal Private Secretary, The Vatican (1978-1982).
 Bishop William Dunne, SPS - Bishop of Kitui (1963-1995)
 Bishop Edmund Fitzgibbon, SPS (1925-2010)
 Bishop John Christopher Mahon, D.C.L, SPS - Bishop of Lodwar, Kenya (1978-2000),
 Bishop James Moynagh, SPS (1903 - 1985)
 Bishop John Alphonsus Ryan MA PhD, SPS
 Bishop Thomas McGettrick, SPS, first Bishop of Abakaliki, Nigeria
 Bishop Maurice Anthony Crowley BSc, SPS, Bishop of the Roman Catholic Diocese of Kitale, Kenya (1998- )

Current organisation
In 2014 St Patrick’s Missionary Society held a General Chapter meeting which elected a new leadership team. In 2015 the society commenced moving its headquarters from Kiltegan in Ireland to Nairobi in Kenya. The Society produces the Africa - St. Patrick's Mission magazine. 
The Society has installed a wind turbine in Kiltegan. There is also a retirement home in Kiltegan for its members.

The Kiltegan Fathers in association with Sisters of the Holy Faith in 2013, worked to set up a primary school in Riwoto, South Sudan.

References

External links
 
 Kiltegan Fathers UK website

Patrick Missionary Society
Christian organizations established in 1932
Societies of apostolic life